Orders to Sentry is the official title of a set of rules governing sentry (guard or watch) duty in the United States Armed Forces. While any guard posting has rules that may go without saying ("Stay awake," for instance), these orders are carefully detailed and particularly stressed in the U.S. Navy, U.S. Marine Corps, and U.S. Coast Guard. Also known as the 11 General Orders, the list is meant to cover any possible scenario a sentry might encounter on duty.

All recruits learn these orders verbatim while at recruit training and are expected to retain the knowledge to use for the remainder of their military careers. It is very common for a drill instructor or (after boot camp) an inspecting officer to ask a question such as, "What is your sixth general order?" and expect an immediate (and correct) reply.

US Navy, Marine Corps, and Coast Guard
The General Orders for Sentries are quite similar between the U.S. Navy and U.S. Marine Corps, the main differences being the titles of positions referenced in the orders. The Navy Junior Reserve Officers' Training Corps (NJROTC), Naval Reserve Officer Training Corps (NROTC) also use the following General Orders to the Sentry.

The U.S. Department of the Navy gives the General Orders for the U.S. Marine Corps as follows:

 To take charge of this post and all government property in view.
 To walk my post in a military manner, keeping always on the alert and observing everything that takes place within sight or hearing.
 To report all violations of orders I am instructed to enforce.
 To repeat all calls from posts more distant from the guardhouse than my own. 
 To quit my post only when properly relieved.
 To receive, obey, and pass on to the sentry who relieves me all orders from the commanding officer, officer of the day, officers, and noncommissioned officers of the guard only. 
 To talk to no one except in the line of duty.
 To give the alarm in case of fire or disorder.
 To call the corporal of the guard in any case not covered by instructions.
 To salute all officers and all colors and standards not cased.
 To be especially watchful at night and during the time for challenging, to challenge all persons on or near my post, and allow no one to pass without proper authority.

General Orders for the Navy and Coast Guard are essentially the same, except for the wording of order numbers 6 and 9:

 6. To receive, obey and pass on to the sentry who relieves me, all orders from the Commanding Officer, Command Duty Officer, Officer of the Deck, and Officers and Petty Officers of the Watch only.
 9. To call the Officer of the Deck in any case not covered by instructions.

General Orders of the Coast Guard:
 6 is similar, however there is a difference in the officers.: To receive, obey and pass on to the sentry who relieves me, all orders from the Commanding Officer, Field Officer of the day, Officer of the day, and Officers and Petty Officers of the Watch.
 9. To call the Petty Officer of the watch in any case not covered by instructions.

U.S. Army
The U.S. Army now uses a condensed form of orders, with three basic instructions. Previously it used the same eleven general orders as the U.S. Navy and U.S. Marines.

  I will guard everything within the limits of my post and quit my post only when properly relieved.
  I will obey my special orders and perform all my duties in a military manner.
  I will report violations of my special orders, emergencies, and anything not covered in my instructions to the commander of the relief.

U.S. Air Force Security Forces
The U.S. Air Force Security Forces also uses a condensed form, with three basics:

  I will take charge of my post and protect personnel and property for which I am responsible, until properly relieved.
  I will report all violations of orders that I am entrusted to enforce and call my superior in any case not covered by instructions.
  I will sound the alarm in any case of disorder or emergency.

References

External links
FM 22-6 Guard Duty

Military terminology
United States military law
Sentries